Elections to the Philippine Legislature were held on June 2, 1925, pursuant to the Philippine Organic Act of 1902 which prescribed elections for every three years. Votes elected 90 members of the House of Representatives in the 1925 Philippine House of Representatives elections; and 24 members of the Senate in the 1925 Philippine Senate elections.

1925
1925 elections in Asia
1925 in the Philippines